Matt Hayes Fishing is a fishing video game for Windows, released in 2002 by Electronic Arts and endorsed by British angler Matt Hayes.

In the game the player can fish for seven species of fish (northern pike, perch, zander, chub, rainbow trout, brown trout and salmon) in the following European locations:

 Loch Lomond in Scotland
 Lough Derg in Ireland
 Grafham Water in Cambridgeshire, England
 a generic English gravel pit
 River Usk in Wales
 Gamlebyviken, an inlet of the Baltic Sea near Västervik in Sweden.

References

2002 video games
Electronic Arts games
Fishing video games
Video games set in Sweden
Video games set in the United Kingdom
Windows games
Windows-only games
Video games based on real people
Hayes
Hayes
Video games developed in the United States